John Mulholland was president of the Irish Republican Brotherhood from 1910 to 1912.

Year of birth missing
Year of death missing
Members of the Irish Republican Brotherhood